The 2003–04 season was the sixth season in the history of Northern Spirit (now North West Sydney Spirit). It was also the sixth and final season in the National Soccer League. Northern Spirit finished 7th in their National Soccer League season.

Players

Transfers

Transfers in

Competitions

Overview

National Soccer League

League table

Results summary

Results by round

Matches

Statistics

Appearances and goals
Players with no appearances not included in the list.

Clean sheets

References

North West Sydney Spirit FC seasons